Amber Arcades is the stage name of Annelotte de Graaf (born 15 December 1988), a Dutch singer-songwriter from Utrecht.

Biography
De Graaf holds a master's degree in law, and worked as an assistant for war crimes tribunals at the United Nations; as of 2016 she held a position "assessing the claims of refugees granted asylum in the Netherlands who are seeking to have their families brought over".  Her music career began when she self-recorded an album in New York City, funded by savings she had amassed since her teenage years. Her output attracted the attention of Heavenly Recordings, which released her debut album, Fading Lines, in June 2016.
In May 2017, Amber Arcades shared their new ethereal track, "Wouldn’t Even Know" featuring Bill Ryder-Jones. Her second album, European Heartbreak, was released by Heavenly Recordings on 28 September 2018. 

Amber Arcades started working with producer Ben Greenberg again during the pandemic for her third album. The album, Barefoot on Diamond Road, featured ten songs produced remotely, mainly between Amsterdam (Annelotte de Graaf), Brooklyn (producer Ben Greenberg) and Los Angeles (drummer Matt Chamberlain). Fire Records released Barefoot on Diamond Road on 10 February 2023.

Amber Arcades previewed some of the new songs on a UK tour ahead of the album release, during Independent Venue Week; a seven date tour together with Hater and Thala, two acts who are also on Fire Records. Amber Arcades returns to SXSW, in Austin, Texas, for several showcases. In the Netherlands, Amber Arcades announced a release tour throughout the country, a co-headlining tour with Robin Kester in March and April. Another UK tour follows in April 2023.

Discography
Amber Arcades EP (2013)
Patiently EP (2015)
Fading Lines (Heavenly Recordings, 2016)
Cannonball EP (Heavenly Recordings, 2017)
European Heartbreak (Heavenly Recordings, 2018)
''Barefoot on Diamond Road (Fire Records, 2023)

References

1988 births
Living people
Musicians from Utrecht (city)
21st-century Dutch singers
Dutch singer-songwriters
Dutch expatriates in the United States
Dutch guitarists
Heavenly Recordings artists
21st-century Dutch women singers
21st-century guitarists
21st-century women guitarists